Francis Jardine "Frank" Bell (January 28, 1840February 13, 1927) was a Canadian-born American politician. He was the sixth governor of Nevada. He was a member of the Republican Party.

Biography
Bell was born on January 28, 1840, in Toronto, in the province of Upper Canada (a British colony at the time; Confederation would not be achieved until another 27 years after his birth). He was educated in the common schools of his native country. He was a distant cousin to Alexander Graham Bell.   He married Mary Poore on July 9, 1872 in Reno, Nevada and they had two children.

Career
Bell came to Nevada in 1858, to supervise the construction of a transcontinental telegraph line though the state from Utah to California. He worked on this project until 1860. Later, Bell became a telegraph operator and was one of operators who telegraphed Nevada's Constitution to Washington D.C. in 1864.

Bell served as warden of the Nevada State Prison from 1883 to 1887. In 1889, he was appointed the eighth lieutenant governor by Charles C. Stevenson. He became acting governor when Governor Stevenson signed a disability certificate on September 1, 1890, making him Nevada's first foreign-born governor.  During his tenure, he continued to carry out the policies of the Stevenson administration.

Bell did not seek a full term, serving until the inauguration of Roswell K. Colcord in 1891. He then returned to his work in the telephone and telegraph field. He continued to be politically active. He served as Warden of the Nevada State Prison from 1893 to 1895 and as justice of the peace from 1905 to 1909.

Death
Bell died on February 13, 1927, in his daughter's home in Oakland, California, at the age of 87. He is interred at Masonic Memorial Gardens in Reno, Nevada.

See also
List of U.S. state governors born outside the United States

References

External links
 
 Biography
Nevada Culture.org
National Governors Association

1840 births
1927 deaths
Pre-Confederation Canadian emigrants to the United States
Republican Party governors of Nevada
Lieutenant Governors of Nevada
Politicians from Toronto